Woof Records is a British independent record label founded by English musicians Tim Hodgkinson and Bill Gilonis in London in 1980.

Background
Tim Hodgkinson and Bill Gilonis began experimenting with tape collages in 1979 and recorded I Do – I Do – I Don't – I Don't, an 18-minute collection of songs. Hodgkinson and Gilonis then created Woof Records to release the title on a 7-inch EP in 1980. They continued to release titles on the label, subject to the restriction that at least one of them had to play on, engineer, or produce each record. Between 1980 and 1994, 15 titles were released on the label.

Releases
 WOOF 001, Bill Gilonis, Tim Hodgkinson, I Do – I Do – I Don't – I Don't, (7", EP), 1980 
 WOOF 002, The Work, "I Hate America", (7", Single, Cle), 1981 
 WOOF 003, The Work, Slow Crimes, (LP), 1982 
 WOOF 005, The Work, The Worst of Everywhere, (Cass, Album, C-9), 1982
 WOOF 006, The Lowest Note on the Organ, The Lowest Note on the Organ, (7", Maxi), 1983 
 WOOF 007, Catherine Jauniaux, Tim Hodgkinson, Fluvial, (LP), 1983 
 WOOF 008, The Lowest Note on the Organ, "Piggy Bank", (7"), 1984 
 WOOF 009, Het, Let's Het, (LP), 1984 
 WOOF 010, Tim Hodgkinson, Splutter, (LP), 1985 
 WOOF 011, The Momes, Spiralling, (LP), 1989 
 WOOF 012, The Work, Rubber Cage, (LP, Album), 1989 
 WOOF 013, Fred Frith, Tim Hodgkinson, Live Improvisations, (CD), 1992 
 WOOF 014, Valentina Ponomareva, Ken Hyder / Tim Hodgkinson, The Goose, (CD, Album) 1992 
 WOOF 015, The Work, See, (CD), 1992 
 WOOF 016, Tim Hodgkinson, Each in Our Own Thoughts, (CD, Album), 1994

References

British independent record labels
Alternative rock record labels
Experimental music record labels
Record labels established in 1980
1980 establishments in the United Kingdom